Kuşadası Gençlik Spor Kulübü, colloquially known as Kuşadasıspor, are a Turkish professional football club located in the Kuşadası district of Aydın.

History
Beating Aliağa Futbol A.Ş. after penalty shoot-outs by 4–2 on 11 July 2021, the club promoted to TFF Third League for 2021–22 season. On 7 February 2022, the club parted ways with its coach Erman Kılıç and began searching for a replacement. Bülent Ataman was announced the next day as the new coach.

Stadium

Kuşadasıspor host their home games at Özer Türk Stadium, holding 8,000 seats capacity. The Stadium was renovated in 2020.

Team records

League affiliation
TFF First League: 1986–1991, 1996–2000
TFF Second League: 1984–1986, 1991–1996, 2000–2001
TFF Third League: 2021–
Turkish Regional Amateur League: 2010–2011, 2015–2016, 2017–2019, 2020–2021
Super Amateur Leagues: 1934–1984, 2001–2010, 2011–2015, 2016–2017, 2019–2020

Honours
TFF Third League
Winner: 1985–86, 1995–96
Aydın Super Amateur League
Runner-up:  2014–15, 2016–17
Aydın First Amateur League
Winner: 2013–14

Kit sponsorships

References

External links
Kuşadasıspor at TFF

Association football clubs established in 1934
TFF Third League clubs